Bijegan (also Romanized as Bījegān and Bījgān; also known as Bījaīgān, Bījekān, and Bijkan) is a village in Jasb Rural District, in the Central District of Delijan County, Markazi Province, Iran. At the 2006 census, its population was 326, in 135 families.

References 

Populated places in Delijan County